This is a list of golfers who have won eight or more events on the European Tour since it was established in 1972. There are some complications in preparing such a list, and different publications have produced different numbers. This list is based on what the European Tour reports the victories being according to their own player guide (through the 2009 season).

The number of wins a player can accumulate on the European Tour depends in part on how many years he devotes to the tour. There have always been some leading European players or European Tour members from outside Europe who have gone on to play part or full-time on the U.S.-based PGA Tour and cut back their commitments in Europe, and this seems to be an increasing trend.

Many of the players on the list have won many events on other tours and unofficial events. The numbers in the "Majors" column are the total number of major championships the player won in his career whether or not he was a member of the European Tour at the time.

Players under 50 years of age are shown in bold. At age 50, golfers become eligible for the major senior tours, most notably the European Senior Tour and the U.S.-based PGA Tour Champions, competing for substantial prize money against other golfers in that age group. Only Miguel Ángel Jiménez and Phil Mickelson have ever won a European Tour event after turning 50, and only three golfers of that age have won on the PGA Tour since 1975.

Players with the same number of wins are listed alphabetically. This list is up to date through 30 January 2023.

H signifies members of the World Golf Hall of Fame.

Detailed criteria
Only European Tour sanctioned events are counted. As all elite golfers enter the four major championships and the four (three before 2009) individual World Golf Championships each season it is possible for a player to accumulate eight wins in European Tour sanctioned events without ever joining the European Tour, and Tiger Woods (who has never joined the European Tour) reached that mark in the 2000 Open Championship.
The three U.S.-based majors were not designated as European Tour events until 1997, so victories in them before that date were initially excluded. This is in contrast to the list of golfers with most PGA Tour wins, which includes Open Championship wins before that tournament became an official money event in 1995, because they were retrospectively designated as PGA Tour wins in 2002. Sometime prior to 2009, the European Tour made such a retrospective designation with respect to the three U.S. majors, as reflected in their 2009 media guide.
Wins in the Wentworth World Match Play Championship before 2003 are not included.
The win lists in the player profiles on the European Tour's official site include some miscellaneous items which are not regular individual tour wins and are therefore excluded: wins in 18 hole pro-ams associated with European Tour events; wins in the Volvo Bonus Pool; team wins in the Seve Trophy; wins on the Challenge Tour and the European Senior Tour.

There are additional players who won eight or more tournaments on the pre-tour European circuit and the European Tour in the period straddling 1972 who are not included on the list.

See also
List of golfers with most PGA Tour wins

References

European
European Tour
 
European Tour